Aghalee is a village, townland and civil parish in County Antrim, Northern Ireland. It is three miles from the southeast corner of Lough Neagh on the main road between Lurgan and Antrim and about 13 kilometres west of Lisburn. The village lies on the steep wooded slopes of Friar's Glen and is beside the now disused Lagan Navigational Canal. In the 2001 Census, Aghalee had a population of 774.

Aghalee has several places of worship, a community hall, Orange Hall, GP Surgery, filling station and shop, a pharmacy and fast food takeaway. The village has a vocational training centre, a nursing home and a children's day nursery. Ulsterbus services link the village with Lisburn, Antrim, Lurgan and Belfast.

History 

Much of the early development of Aghalee was due to its strategic location beside the Lagan Navigational Canal which opened at the end of the 18th century. The village became a distribution centre for the surrounding area and developed as an important lock station on the Lagan Navigation, as it was one of the last sizeable settlements before the canal entered Lough Neagh. While the canal operated, trade continued on a significant scale. When the canal finally ceased to operate in 1954, the area began to decline in commercial importance. The population of the settlement decreased considerably in the latter part of the 19th century and the first part of the 20th century.

The village retains many of the 18th century structures and buildings belonging to the canal. From the 1970s Aghalee developed as a commuter area for Belfast and Craigavon and this was accompanied by significant population growth. In recent times, development has occurred on the lands to the west of the village core.

2001 Census 
Aghalee is classified as a Small Village or Hamlet. On Census day (29 April 2001) there were 774 people living in Aghalee. Of these:
26.0% were aged under 16 years and 8.8% were aged 60 and over
51.2% of the population were male and 48.8% were female
10.6% were from a Catholic background and 85.0% were from a Protestant background
2.7% of people aged 16–74 were unemployed

2011 Census
On Census day in 2011:
15.2% were from a Catholic background and 74.7% were from a Protestant background

See also 
List of villages in Northern Ireland
List of civil parishes in County Antrim

References

External links 
Aghalee Website
Clenaghans Restaurant and Accommodation

Villages in County Antrim
Civil parishes of County Antrim